Nandini Oppol is a 1994 Indian Malayalam-language film,  directed by Mohan Kupplery and produced by Joe Mon. The film is based on the novel of the same name by Sudhakar Mangalodayam and stars Nedumudi Venu, Geetha, Siddique and Ganesh. The film has musical score by Ouseppachan.

Cast
Nedumudi Venu as Balan
Geetha as Nandini
Siddique as Ajayan
Ganesh as Anil
Geetha Vijayan as Latha
Sunitha as Maya
Rajan P. Dev as Adhikari
T. R. Omana as Amma
Sudheesh as Murali
Kuthiravattom Pappu as Kunjunni Nair
Philomina as Ammukutti Amma
Oduvil Unnikrishnan as Maya's father
Santhakumari as Maya's mother
T. P. Madhavan as Latha's father
Vijay Menon as Ramanathan
Kunjandi as Govindan Mama
Bahadoor as Hajiyar
Kozhikode Narayanan Nair as Krishna Panicker
Mala Aravindan

Soundtrack
The songs are penned by O. N. V. Kurup and composed by Ouseppachan.

References

External links
 
 

1994 films
1990s Malayalam-language films
Films based on Malayalam novels
Films directed by Mohan Kupleri
Films scored by Ouseppachan